Narkopop is the fifth studio album by Wolfgang Voigt's Gas project, the first album under the moniker in 17 years and his first on Kompakt. The album was released on 21 April 2017.

Reception

On the review aggregate site Metacritic, Narkopop has a score of 86 out of 100, indicating "universal acclaim", based on 14 reviews. Paul Simpson at AllMusic calls it an "evolution and refinement" of the Gas sound. Mark Richardson from Pitchfork complimented its "deeper, richer, and more luxurious sound" compared to prior Gas releases.

Andrew Ryce at Resident Advisor gave a mostly positive review, but was ambivalent about its more "direct" style, noting "in this sharper relief, you can see the stitches in Voigt's usually seamless work." Daniel Bromfield at Spectrum Culture called it "immovable, monolithic, not to be trifled with" but observed "there's little of the bewitching sound design of the original Gas records".

Exclaim! ranked Narkopop at number six on their Top 10 Dance and Electronic Albums of 2017 list.

Track listing

Vinyl pressing

CD pressing

Note that the digital release has longer track lengths than the CD and vinyl editions. The digital bonus track is the runtime of the album on CD and vinyl (excluding the bonus track found on vinyl, not included on CD and digital releases).

Charts

References

2017 albums
Gas (musician) albums